Bydgoszcz is a Polish parliamentary district in the Kuyavian-Pomeranian Voivodeship, which elects twelve Members of the Sejm. This district has the number "4". The capital of the district is Bydgoszcz.

It includes the counties of Bydgoszcz, Inowrocław, Mogilno, Nakło, Sępólno, Świecie, Tuchola and Żnin.

List of members

2019-2023

See also 
 Kuyavian-Pomeranian Voivodeship

Footnotes

Electoral districts of Poland
Kuyavian-Pomeranian Voivodeship
Politics of Kuyavian-Pomeranian Voivodeship
Bydgoszcz